The 2017–18 St. Francis Brooklyn Terriers women's basketball team represented St. Francis College during the 2017–18 NCAA Division I women's basketball season.  The Terrier's home games were played at the Generoso Pope Athletic Complex. The team has been a member of the Northeast Conference since 1988. St. Francis Brooklyn is coached by John  Thurston, who was in his sixth year at the helm of the Terriers. They finished the season 13–17, 9–9 in NEC play to finish in a tie for third place. They lost in the quarterfinals of the NEC tournament to LIU Brooklyn.

After the 2017-18 season head coach John Thurston retired from coaching the St. Francis Terriers women's basketball team.

Roster

Schedule and results

|-
!colspan=12 style="background:#0038A8; border: 2px solid #CE1126;;color:#FFFFFF;"| Non-Conference Regular Season

|-
!colspan=12 style="background:#0038A8; border: 2px solid #CE1126;;color:#FFFFFF;"| NEC Regular Season

  

 

   
|-
!colspan=12 style="background:#0038A8; border: 2px solid #CE1126;;color:#FFFFFF;"| Northeast Conference tournament

|-

See also
2017–18 St. Francis Brooklyn Terriers men's basketball team

References

St. Francis Brooklyn
St. Francis Brooklyn Terriers women's basketball seasons
Saint Francis Brooklyn Terriers women's basketball
Saint Francis Brooklyn Terriers women's basketball